The 2020 NWSL College Draft was the eighth annual meeting of National Women's Soccer League (NWSL) franchises to select newly eligible college players for the 2020 NWSL season. It was held on January 16, 2020 in conjunction with the United Soccer Coaches Convention at the Baltimore Convention Center in Baltimore, Maryland.

Format
NWSL teams took turns making their selections over four rounds, with nine picks per round. Draft order was determined by the final 2019 regular season standings.
The draft was broadcast live via the NWSL website, Facebook and YouTube.
Final list of registered players was released on January 15, 2020.

Results

Key

Picks

Notable undrafted players
Below is a list of undrafted rookies who appeared in a competitive NWSL game in 2020.

Trades 
Round 1:

Round 2:

Round 3:

Round 4:

Summary
In 2020, a total of 27 colleges had players selected. Of these, four had a player drafted to the NWSL for the first time: Auburn, Bowling Green, NC State and South Florida.

Schools with multiple draft selections

Selections by college athletic conference

Selections by position

See also
 List of NWSL drafts
 List of National Women's Soccer League draftees by college team
 2020 National Women's Soccer League season

References

External links
 

National Women's Soccer League drafts
College Draft
NWSL College Draft
2020s in Baltimore
Soccer in Baltimore
Events in Baltimore
NWSL College Draft